Rafał Kosik (8 October 1971 in Warsaw, Poland) is a Polish science fiction writer. He has published eleven novels.

A Polish-language film based on the series Felix, Net i Nika entitled Felix, Net, and Nika and Theoretically Possible Catastrophe was released in Poland on 28 September 2012.

His 2008 novel Kameleon received the Janusz A. Zajdel Award and Jerzy Żuławski Award. In 2018 he received the Janusz A. Zajdel Award for the novel Różaniec.

Works
 Mars (2003)
 Vertical (2006)
 Kameleon (2008)
 Felix Net and Nika and the Gang of Invisible People (2004)
 Felix Net and Nika and the Theoretically Possible Catastrophe (2005)
 Felix, Net i Nika and Palace of dreams (2006)
 Felix, Net i Nika oraz Pułapka Nieśmiertelności (2007)
 Felix, Net i Nika oraz Orbitalny Spisek (2008)
 Felix, Net i Nika oraz Orbitalny Spisek 2: Mała Armia (2009)
 Felix, Net i Nika and Third cousin (2009)
 Felix, Net i Nika oraz Bunt Maszyn (2011)
 Felix, Net i Nika and Zero world (2011)
 Felix, Net i Nika and Zero world 2. Alternauts (2012)
 Felix, Net i Nika and  extra-curricular stories (2013)
 Felix, Net i Nika and Secret of Czerwona Hańcza (2013)
 Felix, Net i Nika and curse of McKillian's house (2014)
 Felix, Net i Nika and (un)safe adolescence (2015)
Różaniec (2017)
Felix, Net i Nika and the End of the world as we know it (2018) 
Cyberpunk 2077: No Coincidence (2023)

References

External links
Homepage

1971 births
Living people
Writers from Warsaw
Polish children's writers
Polish science fiction writers